Caricias (Caresses) is a studio album by Spanish performer Rocío Dúrcal released on 4 April 2000 by BMG and Ariola. Produced by Argentinian songwriter Bebu Silvetti. In the United States, Caricias peaked at number-two on the Billboard Latin Pop Albums and number-six on Top Latin Albums. The album was certified 2× Platinum (Latin field) by the Recording Industry Association of America (RIAA). The album was nominated for a Lo Nuestro Awards for Pop Album of the Year at the 2001.

The album include "Infiel", the song is the main-theme of the Mexican telenovela "Mujeres Engañadas" starring Laura León and Andrés García, produced by Emilio Larrosa and Televisa. broadcast on Univision on the year 2000.

Track listing

Personnel
Musicians
Rocio Durcal – Vocals
Victor Hugo M. Dominguez and Jesus Sanchez – Drums
Jose Guadalupe Alfaro and Juan Carlos Navarro G. – Guitar
Manny Lopez – Electric guitar, Mandolin
Miguel Darío González P – Bass guitar
Lea Kibler – Flute
Levi Mora Arriaga – Trumpet
Victor Hugo Dominguez, Jesus Sanchez – Drums
José Carlos Giron Flores – Vihuela
Jesus Sanchez Puebla – Bass guitar

Production
Producer: Bebu Silvetti
Engineers: Alfredo Matheus, Steve Orchard, Roberto Collío (México Session) y Carlos Paucar
Assistant engineers: Chris Carroll
Coordinator: Andy Brown
Recorded at: Sony Music México, AIR Lyndhurst Hall (Hampstead), Southpoint Productions (Miami), and The Hit Factory Criteria (Miami)

Label: BMG Music, Ariola International (CD), RCA (Cassette)
Manufactured and Distributed by: BMG Music, Ariola International and RCA International

Awards 
Lo Nuestro Awards

Charts

Certifications

References

2000 albums
Rocío Dúrcal albums
Albums produced by Bebu Silvetti
Albums recorded at AIR Studios